Pathare Prabhu is one of the Hindu communities in the city of Mumbai (formerly known as Bombay).

Introduction

The Pathare Prabhus and the Chandraseniya Kayastha Prabhus (CKPs) are considered sister communities, both being part of the 'Prabhu castes'.
Both Pathare Prabhu and CKP follow the Advaita Vedanta Smartha tradition of Hinduism propounded by Adi Shankara.

Along with all the Maharashtrian Brahmin castes and the CKP,  they are considered one of the 'high' or 'elite' castes of Maharashtra.

The Pathare Prabhu, in the 19th century would to refer to Bombay as 'Desh' (country). They formed the "Union Club" under which were the five primary collectives of Girgaon, Mazagaon, Parel, Mahim and Worli. In 1887, they held a meeting at the "Desh" level in which it was decided to stop inviting "naikins" (dancers) to sing at the Upanayana (thread ceremonies or "munja") and marriage celebrations. Historians cite an incident where a Pathare Prabhu member who broke this rule two years later was socially outcast by the community. He sued for defamation but the British Court ruled against him.

Notable people
Moroba Kanhoba – 19th century writer and social reformer (women's rights advocate), author of the famous Marathi novel "Ghashiram Kotwal". His highly publicized marriage to a widow ended in a tragedy after the couple was found dead within a year of the marriage.
Shivkar Bapuji Talpade – A Vedic Scholar famous for flying an unmanned heavier-than-air aircraft in 1895 in Bombay
Atmaram Sadashiv Jayakar - Notable zoologist, physician, naturalist and explorer. Best known for his scientific study on animals and medical surveys of Oman. He described some unknown species like Arabitragus jayakari, Hippocampus jayakari and Omanosaura jayakari, all named after him. He also studied the Omani dialect of Arabic.
Mahadev Vishwanath Dhurandhar - Well known Indian painter and artist.
Kanhoba Ranchoddas Kirtikar - Notable botanist, surgeon and Marathi poet.
Mukund Ramarao Jayakar - First vice chancellor of the University of Pune.

See also 
 Pathare Prabhu (Kanchole)

References

External links 

 The Pathare Prabhu Community Website
 An interesting description of pathare prabhu culture as experienced by Helena Blavatsky in the 18th century.

Indian castes
Hinduism in Maharashtra
Religion in Mumbai
Social groups of Maharashtra
Social groups of Goa
History of Mumbai
Prabhu Communities of Maharashtra